Estrela, Portuguese for "star", may refer to:

Animals
Estrela Mountain Dog, a breed of working dog native to the range
Phyllonorycter estrela, a moth of the family Gracillariidae

Geography

Portugal
Serra da Estrela Subregion, a NUTS3 statistical subregion of Portugal
Beiras e Serra da Estrela, an administrative division of Portugal
Serra da Estrela, a mountain range in Portugal
Torre (Serra da Estrela), highest point of Mainland Portugal
Serra da Estrela Natural Park, the largest natural conservation area in Portugal
Estrela (Lisbon), a parish located in the municipality of Lisbon, Portugal

Brazil
Centro Oriental Rio-Grandense, one of the Mesoregions in the state of Rio Grande do Sul, Brazil

Alagoas
Estrela de Alagoas, a municipality in the state of Alagoas, Brazil

Goiás state
Estrela do Norte, Goiás, a municipality in north Goiás state, Brazil

Mato Grosso
Porto Estrela, a municipality in the state of Mato Grosso, Brazil

Minas Gerais
Estrela do Indaiá, a municipality in the state of Minas Gerais, Brazil
Estrela Dalva, a municipality in the state of Minas Gerais, Brazil
Estrela do Sul, a municipality the state of Minas Gerais, Brazil

Rio Grande do Sul
Estrela, Rio Grande do Sul, a municipality in Brazil
Estrela Velha, a municipality in the state Rio Grande do Sul, Brazil

São Paulo
Estrela d'Oeste, a municipality in the state of São Paulo, Brazil
Mira Estrela, a municipality in the state of São Paulo, Brazil
Estrela do Norte, São Paulo, a municipality in the state of São Paulo, Brazil

People

Footballers
Estrela (footballer) (born 1995), Angolan footballer born Valdomiro Lameira
Elaine Estrela Moura, Brazilian international woman's football player
Wilson Constantino Novo Estrela, Angolan retired footballer
Nélson Alexandre Farpelha Estrela, Portuguese footballer

Other
Edite Estrela (born 1949), Portuguese socialist politician and Member of the European Parliament

Sports clubs
Estrela do Norte Futebol Clube, a Brazilian football (soccer) club
Estrela de Cantanhez FC, a Guinea-Bissau football team
Estrela dos Amadores, a Cabo Verdean football team
Estrela Negra de Bissau,a Guinea-Bissau football team
Estrela Miyazaki, a former Japanese football club based in Miyazaki
GD Estrela Vermelha, a sports club in Maputo, Mozambique
Estrela Clube Primeiro de Maio, a football (soccer) club from Benguela, Angola
Estrela de Vendas Novas, a sports club from Vendas Novas, Évora, Portugal
Estrela Vermelha (Beira), a Mozambique multi sports club from Beira, Mozambique 
Estrela do Norte Futebol Clube, a Brazilian football club based in Cachoeiro do Itapemirim, Espírito Santo state

Other

Muito (dentro da estrela azulada), an album by Brazilian singer and composer Caetano Veloso
1990 Supertaça Cândido de Oliveira, the 12th edition of the Supertaça Cândido de Oliveira football event
Arena das Dunas, a football stadium in Natal, Brazil
Estrela (company), a Brazilian toy manufacturer
Estrela Basilica, a basilica in Lisbon, Portugal
Escola Catolica Estrela do Mar (Macau) a Catholic school in Macau
Serra da Estrela cheese, a cheese from Serra da Estrela in Portugal with PDO status
Estrela de absinto, a Portuguese-language novel by Brazilian author Oswald de Andrade
Telstar 14 or Estrela do Sul 1, a commercial communications satellite
1990 Taça de Portugal Final, the final match of the 1989–90 Taça de Portugal
Estrela report, a failed EU resolution on women's health and reproductive rights proposed by Edite Estrela

See also
Estrella (disambiguation)